Robert Bryant Plager (March 11, 1943 – March 24, 2021) was a Canadian professional ice hockey defenceman who played in the National Hockey League (NHL) for 14 seasons from 1964 until 1978, primarily for the St. Louis Blues. Plager spent over half a century with the Blues organization in various capacities.

Early career
Plager was born in Kirkland Lake, Ontario, on March 11, 1943.  His father, Gus, worked as the chief official in the Northern Ontario Hockey Association.  Plager played junior hockey with the Guelph Biltmore Mad Hatters and the Guelph Royals.  Known for his aggressive, highly physical play, he broke what was then the Ontario Hockey Association record for penalty minutes in a season in 1961–62.  He subsequently signed a professional contract with the New York Rangers in 1964, but only played 29 games with this club over the next three years, spending most of his time with the minor league Baltimore Clippers.  The NHL's expansion gave Plager his chance to become an NHL regular; he was traded to St. Louis with Gary Sabourin, Tim Ecclestone, and Gord Kannegiesser for Rod Seiling on June 6, 1967.

Blues playing career
Plager was reunited with his brothers Bill and Barclay as all three took the ice for St. Louis Blues as the team started its existence with a hard-hitting, defensive-oriented squad that appeared in three straight Stanley Cup Finals. Bob Plager earned a reputation as a bruising player with a devastating hip check. Off the ice, he was known as a prankster who was able to bond teammates through his lighthearted demeanor. Despite injuries, Plager was able to play 615 games over 11 years on the St. Louis blue line.

Post-playing career
Plager retired from on-ice action in 1978 and took a job with the Blues front office. He is credited with developing the process of advanced scouting. During the 1990–91 season, he took over as head coach of the Peoria Rivermen, a Blues affiliate club. In his one season behind the bench, he led the team to a Turner Cup championship and won the Commissioners' Trophy as coach of the year. During the 1992–93 season, he became the Blues' head coach, but, unhappy with his new role, he resigned after 11 games to return to his job as vice president of player development.

His jersey was retired on February 2, 2017, the seventh for a Blues player.  He was either a player, coach or executive for nearly all of the Blues' existence until his death.

Personal life
Plager's brothers, Bill and Barclay, also played in the NHL.  All three of them played together with the St. Louis Blues from 1968 to 1972. Plager was a convert to Judaism.

Death
Plager died of a "cardiac event" suffered while driving eastbound near St. Louis' Vandeventer neighborhood, on Interstate 64, on March 24, 2021, leading to a two-vehicle collision. During a commemoration ceremony at Enterprise Center, organist Jeremy Boyer played "When The Blues Go Marching In" while Blues alumni carried his coffin out of Enterprise Center to be transported.

Career statistics
Source:

Regular season and playoffs

Coaching record
Source:

See also
List of select Jewish ice hockey players

References

External links

St. Louis Blues biography

1943 births
2021 deaths
Baltimore Clippers players
Canadian ice hockey coaches
Canadian ice hockey defencemen
Converts to Judaism
Guelph Biltmore Mad Hatters players
Guelph Royals players
Ice hockey people from Ontario
Jewish Canadian sportspeople
Jewish ice hockey players
Minnesota Rangers players
New York Rangers players
Road incident deaths in Missouri
Sportspeople from Kirkland Lake
St. Louis Blues announcers
St. Louis Blues coaches
St. Louis Blues executives
St. Louis Blues players
St. Louis Blues scouts
St. Paul Rangers players